Crypsotidia postfusca is a moth of the family Erebidae. It is found in Egypt, Ethiopia, Kenya and Tanzania.

References

Moths described in 2005
Crypsotidia